The 2021 Pan American Weightlifting Championships were held in Guayaquil, Ecuador from 3 to 7 November 2021.

Medal summary

Men

Women

Medal table
Ranking by Big (Total result) medals

Ranking by all medals: Big (Total result) and Small (Snatch and Clean & Jerk)

References

External links
Results

Pan American Weightlifting Championships
Pan American Weightlifting Championships
Pan American Weightlifting Championships
International sports competitions hosted by Ecuador
Sports competitions in Guayaquil
Pan American Weightlifting Championships